Lock and Dam 52 was the 19th lock and dam on the Ohio River.

The lock complex was completed in 1929. The complex was demolished in 2019–20.

According to the New York Times, in 2015 80.2 million tonnes of cargo transited the lock, making it the biggest and most economically important, in the United States. In a profile of the lock, the New York Times called it a "serious bottleneck", causing delays of 15 to 20 hours. Annually, 135 million tonnes of cargo passed through the lock. Olmsted Lock and Dam, completed in 2018, was built to replace lock and dam 52 and nearby lock and dam 53. According to the New York Times, the Olmsted project was scheduled to have been completed in 1998 (although the locks should have been replaced in 1988, since locks have an expected lifespan of approximately 50 years). In November 2016, the New York Times reported the Olmsted project was then scheduled to be complete in October 2018.  The project's cost had ballooned from $775 million to $2.9 billion.

The New York Times reported that according to the US Army Engineers, the federal agency responsible for maintaining navigation on the United States' rivers, the delay in replacing the lock complex with the Olmsted project cost $640 million per year. It has been described as an "emblem of America's crumbling river infrastructure".

See also
 List of locks and dams of the Ohio River
 List of locks and dams of the Upper Mississippi River

References

External links
U.S. Army Corps of Engineers, Pittsburgh District
U.S. Army Corps of Engineers, Huntington District
U.S. Army Corps of Engineers, Louisville District

Dams on the Ohio River
Dams in Kentucky
Dams in Illinois
Dams completed in 1928
Locks of Kentucky
Locks of Illinois